The Gokhran or Gokhran of Russia is a state institution under the Russian Ministry of Finance, responsible for the State Fund of Precious Metals and Precious Stones of the Russian Federation. It is responsible for the purchase, storage, sale, and use of precious metals, precious stones, jewellery, rocks, and minerals by the State Fund.

History 
The Gokhran was created by the SNK decree of 3 February 1920. In the first post-revolutionary years, Gokhran collected the jewelry of the Romanovs, the Kremlin Armoury, the Russian Orthodox Church, as well as valuables confiscated from private collections.

Since 1960, the Gokhran has been part of the USSR Ministry of Finance as the 3rd special department and later the 3rd chief directorate. In 1987 it was reformed into the USSR state storage of valuables. In 1991, it received the status of the committee for precious metals and stones under the Ministry of economy and finance of Russia, and was finally re-established as Gokhran by Government Resolution №1378 (21 November 1996).

Diamond purchasing
During the 2009 financial crisis, the Russian government bought $1 billion in uncut diamonds from the Russian diamond miner Alrosa, in order to support the Russian diamond mining industry while avoiding saturation in the global diamond market and thus further depression of diamond prices. The diamond mining industry is critical to the Yakutia economy.

Other holdings
Russia's Diamond Fund is a part of Gokhran. Gokhran also holds the Order of Victory medals awarded to Konstantin Rokossovsky and Michał Rola-Żymierski.

References

Notes 

Economy of the Soviet Union
Economy of Russia
Diamond industry in the Soviet Union
1920 establishments in Russia